Bradley Buecker is an American television and film director, producer, and editor. He is well known for his work with Ryan Murphy and Brad Falchuk for their series Glee and American Horror Story.

Career
Buecker's first credited job in the entertainment industry was as an editor for the TV documentary Hollywood Remembers Dustin Hoffman. He worked as an editor during 2002 on the ABC reality series The Bachelor.

In 2005 he was hired as an editor on the FX series Nip/Tuck, where he first worked for Murphy and Falchuk.

He went on to edit the pilot episode of Glee for Murphy, Falchuk, and Ian Brennan and became a mainstay editor for the entire run of the series. During its run is when Buecker directed his first hour of television, with the episode "Never Been Kissed". He served as an executive producer and main director on the series' last season, directing the series finale.

Buecker was involved with the development of Falchuk/Murphy's American Horror Story. He served as editor of the first episode, as well as a co-executive producer during the anthology series' first cycle, Murder House. He helmed the series' first season finale, "Afterbirth". With the commencement of the second series, Asylum, Buecker was promoted to executive producer, as well as serving as director for the premiere, "Welcome to Briarcliff".

He directed the 4th episode, "Haunted House", of Brennan, Murphy and Falchuk's Fox series Scream Queens and the 2nd episode of the 2nd series, Warts and All.

Filmography

Notes

External links

American film directors
American television directors
Living people
Year of birth missing (living people)